Mari or Marí is the surname of:

 Audra Mari (born 1994), American model, television host, and beauty pageant titleholder
 Enzo Mari (1932–2020), Italian modernist artist and furniture designer
 Giacomo Mari (1924–1991), Italian footballer
 José Mari (born 1978), Spanish footballer
 Lamberto Mari (born 1933), Italian diver who competed in two Olympic Games
 Michele Mari (born 1955), Italian novelist, short story writer, critic and poet, son of Enzo Mari
 Miguel Marí (born 1997), Spanish footballer
 Mufid Mari (born 1959), Israeli Druze politician
 Pablo Marí (born 1993), Spanish footballer